Illolampra is a genus of beetles in the family Buprestidae, containing the following species:

 Illolampra ampulla Zhang, Sun & Zhang, 1994
 Illolampra phlegma Zhang, Sun & Zhang, 1994

References

Buprestidae genera